Teleiodes saltuum is a species of moth of the family Gelechiidae. It is found from Norway and Sweden south to France, Italy, Slovenia, Serbia and Montenegro and Romania and from the Netherlands east to Poland.

The wingspan is 15–18 mm.

The larvae feed on Larix species and Pinus sylvestris.

References

Teleiodes
Moths of Europe
Moths described in 1878